Dichelopa castanopis is a species of moth of the family Tortricidae. It is found on the Marquesas Archipelago in French Polynesia.

References

Moths described in 1934
Dichelopa